Luke Hunter is an Australian biologist.

He currently heads the Great Cats Program of the Wildlife Conservation Society, and held positions at universities in Australia and South Africa. Hunter has worked on the ecology and conservation of carnivores in Africa since 1992. His doctorate and post-doctoral research developed methods to re-establish populations of cheetahs and lions in areas where they had been extirpated from Southern Africa. His current projects include assessing the effects of sport hunting and illegal persecution on leopards outside protected areas, developing a conservation strategy for lions across their African range, and the first intensive study of Persian leopards, striped hyaenas, wolves and the last surviving Asiatic cheetahs in Iran.

Publications 
 Hunter, Luke, and Priscilla Barrett. Wild Cats of the World. London ; New York : Bloomsbury Natural History, 2015
 Hunter, Luke, and Priscilla Barrett. Carnivores of the World. Princeton, NJ: Princeton University Press, 2011.
 Raubtiere der Welt : ein Feldführer (German translation, 2012)
 Hunter, Luke, and Gerald Hinde. Cats of Africa: Behavior, Ecology, and Conservation. Baltimore, MD: Johns Hopkins University Press, 2006.
 Hunter, Luke, Susan Rhind, and David Andrew. Watching Wildlife: Southern Africa. Melbourne: Lonely Planet, 2002.
 Hunter, Luke, and David Andrew. Watching Wildlife: Central America. Footscray, Vic: Lonely Planet Publications, 2002.

References

External links
Profile at Panthera

Year of birth missing (living people)
Living people
Australian conservationists